Hexastylis rhombiformis, the North Fork heartleaf or French Broad heartleaf, is a wildflower of the family Aristolochiaceae found in North Carolina and South Carolina in the United States. The population of this species discovered in 1982 included about 50 plants. It has been postulated that, due to similarities between the three plants, Hexastylus rhombiformis may be a natural hybrid between Hexastylis arifolia and another local Hexastylis species.

Description
Hexastylis rhombiformis is an evergreen herb with solitary flowers. Flower colors range from dark purple to white. The leaf blades are not variegated. The stigmas are round.

References

Aristolochiaceae